São Thomé das Letras is a municipality in the south of Minas Gerais state in southeastern Brazil,  east of Três Corações city. It has a population of 7,120 (2020) with a population density of 18 inhabitants per square kilometer.

Economic activities

The major economic activities are stone mining and natural tourism deeply focused on the alternative lifestyle. 
São Thomé das Letras has a large number of waterfalls, natural jungle (known as "Mata Atlântica") and cave systems.

History

The name of the town was based on a legend of a black slave on the run from the plantation of the powerful Baron of Alfenas. He found a statue of Saint Thomas with a perfectly written letter with superb calligraphy (impossible for an illiterate untrained slave) in a grotto. Greatly amazed by the story the Baron freed the slave and later ordered the construction of a church beside of the grotto in what it is now the centre of São Thomé das Letras.

The Cataguá Indians inhabited the region until the 18th century when they were expelled by the bandeirantes, Portuguese settlers who settled the interior of Brazil.

Construction of the cathedral of São Thomé das Letras began in 1785. It was ultimately decorated with paintings in the Brazil baroque style by Joaquim José da Natividade.

In the 19th century farmers from the region built homes in São Thomé das Letras to use during festival periods, remaining empty the rest of the year.

Quartzite mining began in the early 20th century and became a major part of the economic activity of the town.

One of the images by Joaquim José da Natividade was stolen in 1991.

During the 2020 pandemics, the city closed its doors to visiting tourists citing concernings about virus spreading, to this day (July, 26) there's not a single case of COVID-19 reported among the inhabitants, but the already fragile touristic economy is suffering greatly, according to G1 Sul de Minas São Thomé das Letras.

Geological features

São Thomé das Letras is a typically provincial locality, built on a wide mineral quartzite deposit - known as rock-of-saint-thome (widely used in the edge pavement of swimming pools) that they had been used in the construction of some houses in the town, the stone pavement of the streets and currently heavily used in the elaboration of local handcrafts, like small houses made of rock sold as souvenir to tourists.

It's privileged localization with its rustic and typically "mineiro" countryside style, in point mountainous and raised the 1,440 meters above sea level (allowing the view of practically an all the enclosed region around, valleys and mountains), makes with that the town is preferred destination of many enthusiastic tourists of the nature and people who likes arts in general, having been also scene for an old soap opera of the extinct Manchete TV.

There are a lot of "must be seen attractions": the Grotto of São Thomé, Carimbado Grotto, Pyramid House (a mysterious and them-currently abandoned Scorpio-shaped quartzite house), rock formations - of the Witch it is most famous, constructions in rock and the waterfalls - Shangri-lá, Eubiose, Bridal Veil (Véu da Noiva), Paradise and of the Moon, among others.

Mysticism

Some believe that São Thomé das Letras is one of the seven energy points of the Earth, which is a main attraction for mystics, spiritualists, scientific and alternative societies. All those elements give to the town the title of "mystic". The town's most famous legend involves a mystical character named Chico Taquara who the locals believe to have control of animals and who vanished inside the Carimbado cave long ago. It's not unusual to hear about UFO sightings; many people climb the hill near to the "Casa da Pirâmide" looking for signs of UFOs or aerial phenomena.

References

External links

Municipalities in Minas Gerais